Leptocroca sanguinolenta is a moth of the family Oecophoridae. It is found in New South Wales (Australia) and New Zealand.

Description
The wingspan is about 20 mm. The forewings have a zig-zag pattern of light and dark pinkish brown. The hindwings are silky fawn.

References

External links

Moths described in 1886
Oecophorinae
Moths of Australia
Moths of New Zealand